Karl Mildenberger (23 November 1937 – 4 October 2018) was a German heavyweight boxer. He was the European Heavyweight Champion from 1964 to 1968, during which he retained the title six times. He unsuccessfully challenged Muhammad Ali for the World Heavyweight title in September 1966.

Biography
Mildenberger learned the fight trade, growing up in Occupied Germany. A cousin of his father's, a former boxing champion during the Third Reich, began Karl's fistic education; he then joined the boxing program run by FC Kaiserslautern. He eventually displayed enough promise to be sent to Mannheim for training, as Mildenberger lived in the French Sector of the occupation, which forbade the practice of prizefighting; Mannheim, in the American Sector, had no such restriction.

Mildenberger lost his first fight for the European Heavyweight title when he was knocked out by Welsh boxer Dick Richardson in one round in April 1962. Karl rebounded with wins over Joe Erskine, Archie McBride, Joe Bygraves and a knockout win over Billy Daniels. Mildenberger then got a draw with highly ranked Zora Folley in April 1964. Later that year, Mildenberger scored a first-round knockout over Sante Amonte to capture the European Heavyweight title.

After defending his European title three times, Mildenberger fought Muhammad Ali for the World Heavyweight Title in September 1966. Mildenberger, the first southpaw to fight for the World Heavyweight title, frustrated the champ for most of the fight, but ultimately lost by TKO when the referee stopped the fight at 1:28 of the twelfth round following a flurry of punches by Ali. Years later, Angelo Dundee said an eighth round punch to the liver area hurt Ali, whose ability to withstand body blows was legendary.
    
In 1967, Mildenberger participated in a tournament staged by the World Boxing Association to determine the new heavyweight champion after Ali was stripped of the title for refusing induction into the US military draft.  In the first round of the tournament, getting off the deck, he lost to Oscar Bonavena by a clear twelve-round decision.

Mildenberger was not the same afterwards, and was knocked out by contender Leotis Martin in seven rounds (April 1968). Subsequently, in September 1968, Mildenberger's career ended when he lost the European Heavyweight title to Henry Cooper by eighth round disqualification after headbutting his opponent. Mildenberger has said of his timing of retirement, "If I had retained the title, I would have relinquished it. Win, lose or draw, I would have retired, anyway. ...This was the end. I was unharmed. No terrible things had happened to me."

Mildenberger worked as a lifeguard after his retirement from boxing. He died at the age of 80 on 4 October 2018.

Professional boxing record

|-
| style="text-align:center;" colspan="8"|53 wins (19 knockouts, 34 decisions), 6 losses (4 knockouts, 1 decision, 1 DQ), 3 draws
|-  style="text-align:center; background:#e3e3e3;"
|  style="border-style:none none solid solid; "|Result
|  style="border-style:none none solid solid; "|Record
|  style="border-style:none none solid solid; "|Opponent
|  style="border-style:none none solid solid; "|Type
|  style="border-style:none none solid solid; "|Round
|  style="border-style:none none solid solid; "|Date
|  style="border-style:none none solid solid; "|Location
|  style="border-style:none none solid solid; "|Notes
|- 
|Loss
|53–6–3
|align=left| Henry Cooper
|DQ
|8
|18 September 1968
|align=left| Empire Pool, London, England
|align=left|
|-
|Loss
|53–5–3
|align=left| Leotis Martin
|KO
|7
|5 April 1968
|align=left| Festhalle Frankfurt, Frankfurt, Germany
|align=left|
|-
|Win
|53–4–3
|align=left| Gerhard Zech
|PTS
|15
|30 December 1967
|align=left| Sportpalast, Schoeneberg, Berlin
|align=left|
|-
|Loss
|52–4–3
|align=left| Oscar Bonavena
|UD
|12
|16 September 1967
|align=left| Waldstadion, Frankfurt, Germany
|align=left|
|-
|Win
|52–3–3
|align=left| Amos Lincoln
|TKO
|6
|6 May 1967
|align=left| Festhalle Frankfurt, Frankfurt, Germany
|align=left|
|-
|Win
|51–3–3
|align=left| Billy Walker
|TKO
|8
|21 March 1967
|align=left| Empire Pool, London, England
|align=left|
|-
|Win
|50–3–3
|align=left| Piero Tomasoni
|PTS
|15
|1 February 1967
|align=left| Festhalle Frankfurt, Frankfurt, Germany
|align=left|
|-
|Loss
|49–3–3
|align=left| Muhammad Ali
|TKO
|12
|10 September 1966
|align=left| Waldstadion, Frankfurt, Germany
|align=left|
|-
|Win
|49–2–3
|align=left| Ivan Prebeg
|PTS
|15
|15 June 1966
|align=left| Festhalle Frankfurt, Frankfurt, Germany
|align=left|
|-
|Win
|48–2–3
|align=left| Eddie Machen
|PTS
|10
|3 February 1966
|align=left| Festhalle Frankfurt, Frankfurt, Germany
|align=left|
|-
|Win
|47–2–3
|align=left| Gerhard Zech
|PTS
|15
|26 November 1965
|align=left| Festhalle Frankfurt, Frankfurt, Germany
|align=left|
|-
|Win
|46–2–3
|align=left| David E. Bailey
|PTS
|10
|10 September 1965
|align=left| Ernst Merck Halle, Hamburg
|align=left|
|-
|Win
|45–2–3
|align=left| Piero Tomasoni
|PTS
|15
|14 May 1965
|align=left| Festhalle Frankfurt, Frankfurt, Germany
|align=left|
|-
|Win
|44–2–3
|align=left| Kirk Barrow
|KO
|5
|9 April 1965
|align=left| Ernst Merck Halle, Hamburg
|align=left|
|-
|Win
|43–2–3
|align=left| Jefferson Davis
|PTS
|10
|22 January 1965
|align=left| Festhalle Frankfurt, Frankfurt, Germany
|align=left|
|-
|Win
|42–2–3
|align=left| Ollie Wilson
|TKO
|4
|4 December 1964
|align=left| Festhalle Frankfurt, Frankfurt, Germany
|align=left|
|-
|Draw
|41–2–3
|align=left| Amos Johnson
|PTS
|10
|20 November 1964
|align=left| Deutschlandhalle, Charlottenburg, Berlin
|align=left|
|-
|Win
|41–2–2
|align=left| Santo Amonti
|KO
|1
|17 October 1964
|align=left| Deutschlandhalle, Charlottenburg, Berlin
|align=left|
|-
|Draw
|40–2–2
|align=left| Zora Folley
|PTS
|10
|17 April 1964
|align=left| Festhalle Frankfurt, Frankfurt, Germany
|align=left|
|-
|Win
|40–2–1
|align=left| Archie McBride
|PTS
|10
|25 January 1964
|align=left| Sportpalast, Schoeneberg, Berlin
|align=left|
|-
|Win
|39–2–1
|align=left| Billy Daniels
|KO
|3
|29 November 1963
|align=left| Festhalle Frankfurt, Frankfurt, Germany
|align=left|
|-
|Win
|38–2–1
|align=left| Joe Erskine
|PTS
|10
|13 October 1963
|align=left| Westfalenhallen, Dortmund, Germany
|align=left|
|-
|Win
|37–2–1
|align=left| Wayne Bethea
|PTS
|10
|6 July 1963
|align=left| Deutschlandhalle, Charlottenburg, Berlin
|align=left|
|-
|Win
|36–2–1
|align=left| Von Clay
|PTS
|10
|10 May 1963
|align=left| Deutschlandhalle, Charlottenburg, Berlin
|align=left|
|-
|Win
|35–2–1
|align=left| Ulli Ritter
|PTS
|10
|20 April 1963
|align=left| Ostseehalle, Kiel, Germany
|align=left|
|-
|Draw
|34–2–1
|align=left| Archie McBride
|PTS
|10
|26 January 1963
|align=left| Sportpalast, Schoeneberg, Berlin
|align=left|
|-
|Win
|34–2
|align=left| Joe Bygraves
|PTS
|3
|30 November 1962
|align=left| Festhalle Frankfurt, Frankfurt, Germany
|align=left|
|-
|Win
|33–2
|align=left| Alonzo Johnson
|PTS
|10
|17 November 1962
|align=left| Westfalenhallen, Dortmund, Germany
|align=left|
|-
|Win
|32–2
|align=left| John Robert Henry
|PTS
|8
|6 October 1962
|align=left| Messesporthalle, Cologne, Germany
|align=left|
|-
|Win
|31–2
|align=left| Federico Friso
|PTS
|10
|1 September 1962
|align=left| Messesporthalle, Cologne, Germany
|align=left|
|-
|Loss
|30–2
|align=left| Dick Richardson
|KO
|1
|24 February 1962
|align=left| Westfalenhallen, Dortmund, Germany
|align=left|
|-
|Win
|30–1
|align=left| Pete Rademacher
|PTS
|10
|20 January 1962
|align=left| Westfalenhallen, Dortmund, Germany
|align=left|
|-
|Win
|29–1
|align=left| Howard King
|PTS
|10
|24 November 1961
|align=left| Festhalle Frankfurt, Frankfurt, Germany
|align=left|
|-
|Win
|28–1
|align=left| Wayne Bethea
|PTS
|10
|3 November 1961
|align=left| Ernst Merck Halle, Hamburg
|align=left|
|-
|Win
|27–1
|align=left| Young Jack Johnson
|PTS
|10
|29 September 1961
|align=left| Sportpalast, Schoeneberg, Berlin
|align=left|
|-
|Win
|26–1
|align=left| José González Sales
|KO
|2
|10 September 1961
|align=left| Eisstadion, Cologne, Germany

|align=left|
|-
|Win
|25–1
|align=left| Walter Haufft
|TKO
|2
|3 June 1961
|align=left| Eisstadion, Cologne, Germany
|align=left|
|-
|Win
|24–1
|align=left| Frankie Daniels
|PTS
|10
|28 April 1961
|align=left| Sportpalast, Schoeneberg, Berlin
|align=left|
|-
|Win
|23–1
|align=left| Törner Åhsman
|TKO
|4
|17 March 1961
|align=left| Sportpalast, Schoeneberg, Berlin
|align=left|
|-
|Win
|22–1
|align=left| Hal Carter
|TKO
|8
|20 January 1961
|align=left| Sportpalast, Schoeneberg, Berlin
|align=left|
|-
|Win
|21–1
|align=left| Franco Cavicchi
|PTS
|10
|7 December 1960
|align=left| Bologna, Italy
|align=left|
|-
|Win
|20–1
|align=left| Hans Friedrich
|TKO
|3
|26 November 1960
|align=left| Festhalle Frankfurt, Frankfurt, Germany
|align=left|
|-
|Win
|19–1
|align=left| Robert Archie Moore
|PTS
|8
|29 October 1960
|align=left| Ostseehalle, Kiel, Germany
|align=left|
|-
|Win
|18–1
|align=left| Alain Cherville
|TKO
|4
|1 October 1960
|align=left| Westfalenhallen, Dortmund, Germany
|align=left|
|-
|Win
|17–1
|align=left| Alex Buxton
|PTS
|8
|6 May 1960
|align=left| Ernst Merck Halle, Mitte, Berlin
|align=left|
|-
|Win
|16–1
|align=left| Francois Kania
|KO
|3
|22 April 1960
|align=left| Ostseehalle, Kiel, Germany
|align=left|
|-
|Win
|15–1
|align=left| Sammy Langford
|TKO
|3
|8 April 1960
|align=left| Sportpalast, Schoeneberg, Berlin
|align=left|
|-
|Win
|14–1
|align=left| Ron Redrup
|TKO
|7
|13 February 1960
|align=left| Killesbergpark, Stuttgart, Germany
|align=left|
|-
|Win
|13–1
|align=left| Jimmy Slade
|PTS
|8
|30 December 1959
|align=left| Sportpalast, Schoeneberg, Berlin
|align=left|
|-
|Win
|12–1
|align=left| Wim Snoek
|PTS
|8
|12 December 1959
|align=left| Killesbergpark, Stuttgart, Germany
|align=left|
|-
|Loss
|11–1
|align=left| Helmut Ball
|KO
|7
|7 November 1959
|align=left| Killesbergpark, Stuttgart, Germany
|align=left|
|-
|Win
|11–0
|align=left| Arthur Howard
|PTS
|8
|4 July 1959
|align=left| Deutschlandhalle, Charlottenburg, Berlin
|align=left|
|-
|Win
|10–0
|align=left| Wim Snoek
|PTS
|8
|6 June 1959
|align=left| Killesbergpark, Stuttgart, Germany
|align=left|
|-
|Win
|9–0
|align=left| Jacques Bro
|KO
|5
|9 May 1959
|align=left| Killesbergpark, Stuttgart, Germany
|align=left|
|-
|Win
|8–0
|align=left| Pedro Klijssen
|PTS
|8
|24 April 1959
|align=left| Grugahalle, Essen, Germany
|align=left|
|-
|Win
|7–0
|align=left| Alain Cherville
|PTS
|8
|14 March 1959
|align=left| Killesbergpark, Stuttgart, Germany
|align=left|
|-
|Win
|6–0
|align=left| Louis DeBolster
|KO
|3
|14 February 1959
|align=left| Landwirtschaftshalle, Kaiserslautern, Germany
|align=left|
|-
|Win
|5–0
|align=left| Andre Wyns
|PTS
|8
|13 December 1958
|align=left| Killesbergpark, Stuttgart, Germany
|align=left|
|-
|Win
|4–0
|align=left| Jose Mariano Moracia Ibanes
|PTS
|8
|5 December 1958
|align=left| Bayernhalle, Munich, Germany
|align=left|
|-
|Win
|3–0
|align=left| Andre Oueille
|TKO
|5
|15 November 1958
|align=left| Killesbergpark, Stuttgart, Germany
|align=left|
|-
|Win
|2–0
|align=left| Guenter Huber
|PTS
|4
|9 November 1958
|align=left| Schwarzwaldhalle, Karlsruhe, Germany
|align=left|
|-
|Win
|1–0
|align=left| Manfred Striemer
|KO
|1
|15 October 1958
|align=left| Killesbergpark, Stuttgart, Germany
|align=left|

Exhibition boxing record

Bibliography

References

Mildenberger,Karl
2018 deaths
Heavyweight boxers
European Boxing Union champions
German male boxers
People from Kaiserslautern
Sportspeople from Rhineland-Palatinate